Kocaöz is a town (belde) and municipality in the Çobanlar District, Afyonkarahisar Province, Turkey. Its population is 2,777 (2021).

References

Towns in Turkey
Populated places in Afyonkarahisar Province
Çobanlar District